Jaroslav Bouček (13 November 1912 – 10 October 1987) was a Czech footballer. He played for AC Sparta Prague, Stade Rennais FC and the Czechoslovakia national football team.

He earned a total of 31 international caps, scoring 1 goal, from 1934 to 1939. He was part of the squad that finished as runners-up in the 1934 FIFA World Cup, but did not play in the tournament. Four years later, he played in the 1938 FIFA World Cup.

External links
 
 

1912 births
1987 deaths
Czech footballers
Czechoslovak footballers
Czechoslovakia international footballers
Czechoslovak expatriate footballers
Expatriate footballers in France
1934 FIFA World Cup players
1938 FIFA World Cup players
AC Sparta Prague players
Stade Rennais F.C. players
Ligue 1 players
Czechoslovak expatriate sportspeople in France
Association football midfielders
People from Černošice
People from the Kingdom of Bohemia
Sportspeople from the Central Bohemian Region